The Lone Star Ranger is a 1930 American  pre-Code Western film directed by A.F. Erickson and written by Seton I. Miller and John Hunter Booth. The film stars George O'Brien, Sue Carol, Walter McGrail, Warren Hymer, Russell Simpson and Roy Stewart. It is based on the novel The Lone Star Ranger by Zane Grey. The film was released on January 5, 1930, by Fox Film Corporation.

Parts of the film were shot in Monument Valley and Rainbow Bridge in Utah.

Cast        
George O'Brien as Buck Duane
Sue Carol as Mary Aldridge
Walter McGrail as Phil Lawson
Warren Hymer as Bowery Kid
Russell Simpson as Colonel John Aldridge
Roy Stewart as Captain McNally
Lee Shumway as Henchman Red Cane
Colin Chase as Tom Laramie
Richard Alexander as Henchman
Joel Franz as Hank Jones
Joe Rickson as Henchman
Oliver Eckhardt as Lem Parker
Caroline Rankin as Mrs. Parker
Elizabeth Patterson as Sarah Martin
Billy Butts as Bill Jones
Delmar Watson as Baby Jones	
William Steele as First Deputy
Bob Fleming as Second Deputy

Other versions 
This Zane Grey novel was adapted four or more times to film.  Silent versions were released in 1919 and 1923. The version released in 1930 was tagged as "Zane Grey's first all talking picture". The fourth adaptation was released in 1942.

References

External links 
 

1930 films
1930s English-language films
Fox Film films
American Western (genre) films
1930 Western (genre) films
Films based on works by Zane Grey
Films based on Western (genre) novels
American black-and-white films
Films shot in Utah
1930s American films